Hanna Karin Daglund (born 3 April 1994) is a former Swedish handball player. She last played for Viborg HK

She began handball in her hometown Västerås and played for VästersIrsta HF until 2013. She then attended Skuru IK where she stayed for four years and was defeated three times in the Champions final. 2017 she left for Denmark and Viborg HK. After injuries with concussions, she stopped playing handball in 2019

She was playing for the Swedish youth national team and won a gold medal in U-20 World Cup 2012 but  never played for Sweden women's national handball team.

References

1994 births
Living people
Swedish female handball players
Sportspeople from Västerås